The Women's 800 metre freestyle competition of the 2016 FINA World Swimming Championships (25 m) was held on 7 and 8 December 2016.

Records
Prior to the competition, the existing world and championship records were as follows.

Results

Heats
The heats were held at 11:31.

Final
The final was held at 20:06.

References

Women's 800 metre freestyle